Corey Dominique Smith (October 2, 1979 – March 1, 2009) was an American football defensive end. He was originally signed by the Tampa Bay Buccaneers as an undrafted free agent in 2002. He played college football at North Carolina State.

Smith also played for the San Francisco 49ers and Detroit Lions.

Boating incident and disappearance 

On March 1, 2009, the United States Coast Guard reported that a  fishing boat was missing off the Gulf Coast near Clearwater Pass, Florida. The boat was carrying four passengers, including Smith; Marquis Cooper, a member of the Oakland Raiders; as well as Nick Schuyler and Will Bleakley, former University of South Florida football players. The four men left Clearwater Pass on February 28 at 6:30 a.m. and were expected to return later that night. The Coast Guard Cutter USCGC Tornado began searching for the missing boat shortly after midnight on March 1, 2009. By 1:35 p.m. EST on March 2, 2009, the boat was located, overturned, with Schuyler clinging to it. The other three passengers were not found.  According to Schuyler, Cooper separated from the group at 5:30 AM, with Smith disappearing about an hour later. 24 hours later, Bleakley became unresponsive, and despite Schuyler giving him CPR, he also disappeared. Schuyler was found less than six hours later. The search for the three men who remained missing ended at sundown on March 3, 2009. Friends and relatives organized a private search which was called off several days later.

Smith's family has established the Corey D. Smith Memorial Scholarship Fund in his honor. The Detroit Lions held a memorial service for him on March 21, 2009.
The Detroit Lions announced they would retire Smith's #93 during the 2009 season in honor of him.

An investigation by the Florida Fish and Wildlife Conservation Commission determined that the incident was caused when the vessel was improperly anchored, and the boat capsized after one of the passengers tried to throttle forward in an attempt to pry loose the anchor.

Smith was named the 2009 recipient of the Detroit Lions/Detroit Sports Broadcasters Association/Pro Football Writers Association's Media-Friendly "Good Guy" Award. The Good Guy Award is given yearly to the Detroit Lions player who shows consideration to, and cooperation with the media at all times during the course of the season. His family accepted the award on behalf of the late NFL player.

References

External links 
 Detroit Lions bio

1979 births
2009 deaths
African-American players of American football
American football defensive ends
American football linebackers
Detroit Lions players
NC State Wolfpack football players
Players of American football from Richmond, Virginia
San Francisco 49ers players
Tampa Bay Buccaneers players
Boating accident deaths
Accidental deaths in Florida